Michio Ihara (born 1928, Paris) is a Japanese kinetic sculptor, educated in Japan who was influenced by the work of George Rickey. His works have been on display at the Rockefeller Center in New York and other international venues.

External links
De Cordova Museum
Michio Ihara.com

1928 births
Living people
Japanese sculptors
Date of birth missing (living people)
Sculptors from Paris
20th-century Japanese male artists